The Arsenyev constituency (No. 64) is a Russian legislative constituency in Primorsky Krai. Since 1993 the constituency covered most of upstate Primorsky Krai north of Vladivostok. In 2016 the constituency lost Spassk-Dalny to Artyom constituency but gained Nakhodka and Partizansk from the dismantled Ussuriysk constituency.

Members elected

Election results

1993

|-
! colspan=2 style="background-color:#E9E9E9;text-align:left;vertical-align:top;" |Candidate
! style="background-color:#E9E9E9;text-align:left;vertical-align:top;" |Party
! style="background-color:#E9E9E9;text-align:right;" |Votes
! style="background-color:#E9E9E9;text-align:right;" |%
|-
|style="background-color:"|
|align=left|Valery Nesterenko
|align=left|Independent
|
|20.16%
|-
|style="background-color:"|
|align=left|Azat Yusupov
|align=left|Independent
| -
|20.00%
|-
| colspan="5" style="background-color:#E9E9E9;"|
|- style="font-weight:bold"
| colspan="3" style="text-align:left;" | Total
| 
| 100%
|-
| colspan="5" style="background-color:#E9E9E9;"|
|- style="font-weight:bold"
| colspan="4" |Source:
|
|}

1995

|-
! colspan=2 style="background-color:#E9E9E9;text-align:left;vertical-align:top;" |Candidate
! style="background-color:#E9E9E9;text-align:left;vertical-align:top;" |Party
! style="background-color:#E9E9E9;text-align:right;" |Votes
! style="background-color:#E9E9E9;text-align:right;" |%
|-
|style="background-color:#E98282"|
|align=left|Svetlana Orlova
|align=left|Women of Russia
|
|25.13%
|-
|style="background-color:"|
|align=left|Vladimir Grishukov
|align=left|Communist Party
|
|17.36%
|-
|style="background-color:"|
|align=left|Valery Novikov
|align=left|Liberal Democratic Party
|
|8.02%
|-
|style="background-color:"|
|align=left|Aleksandr Sandler
|align=left|Independent
|
|5.69%
|-
|style="background-color:"|
|align=left|Aleksandr Tretyakov
|align=left|Independent
|
|5.50%
|-
|style="background-color:#A8A821"|
|align=left|Valery Nesterenko (incumbent)
|align=left|Stable Russia
|
|5.29%
|-
|style="background-color:"|
|align=left|Aleksey Pinchuk
|align=left|Agrarian Party
|
|5.15%
|-
|style="background-color:#D50000"|
|align=left|Mikhail Krapivko
|align=left|Communists and Working Russia - for the Soviet Union
|
|3.15%
|-
|style="background-color:"|
|align=left|Aleksandr Savchenko
|align=left|Independent
|
|2.90%
|-
|style="background-color:"|
|align=left|Yury Kolinko
|align=left|Independent
|
|2.41%
|-
|style="background-color:"|
|align=left|Viktor Korochin
|align=left|Independent
|
|2.35%
|-
|style="background-color:#EE2D2A"|
|align=left|Alla Omelyuk
|align=left|Block of Djuna
|
|1.76%
|-
|style="background-color:#265BAB"|
|align=left|Yan Bystrov
|align=left|Russian Lawyers' Association
|
|1.36%
|-
|style="background-color:#1C1A0D"|
|align=left|Aleksandr Vladislavlev
|align=left|Forward, Russia!
|
|1.29%
|-
|style="background-color:#000000"|
|colspan=2 |against all
|
|10.64%
|-
| colspan="5" style="background-color:#E9E9E9;"|
|- style="font-weight:bold"
| colspan="3" style="text-align:left;" | Total
| 
| 100%
|-
| colspan="5" style="background-color:#E9E9E9;"|
|- style="font-weight:bold"
| colspan="4" |Source:
|
|}

1999

|-
! colspan=2 style="background-color:#E9E9E9;text-align:left;vertical-align:top;" |Candidate
! style="background-color:#E9E9E9;text-align:left;vertical-align:top;" |Party
! style="background-color:#E9E9E9;text-align:right;" |Votes
! style="background-color:#E9E9E9;text-align:right;" |%
|-
|style="background-color:"|
|align=left|Vladimir Grishukov
|align=left|Communist Party
|
|25.02%
|-
|style="background-color:"|
|align=left|Yury Serebryakov
|align=left|Independent
|
|24.71%
|-
|style="background-color:"|
|align=left|Yevgeny Bolshakov
|align=left|Independent
|
|9.61%
|-
|style="background-color:"|
|align=left|Sergey Plevako
|align=left|Independent
|
|7.11%
|-
|style="background-color:"|
|align=left|Vladimir Petrov
|align=left|Liberal Democratic Party
|
|2.79%
|-
|style="background-color:"|
|align=left|Grigory Pravda
|align=left|Independent
|
|2.45%
|-
|style="background-color:"|
|align=left|Aleksandr Sivash
|align=left|Independent
|
|2.43%
|-
|style="background-color:#FF4400"|
|align=left|Yury Korsakov
|align=left|Andrey Nikolayev and Svyatoslav Fyodorov Bloc
|
|2.42%
|-
|style="background-color:"|
|align=left|Sergey Loktionov
|align=left|Independent
|
|2.20%
|-
|style="background-color:"|
|align=left|Sergey Samodumsky
|align=left|Yabloko
|
|2.19%
|-
|style="background-color:#000000"|
|colspan=2 |against all
|
|16.11%
|-
| colspan="5" style="background-color:#E9E9E9;"|
|- style="font-weight:bold"
| colspan="3" style="text-align:left;" | Total
| 
| 100%
|-
| colspan="5" style="background-color:#E9E9E9;"|
|- style="font-weight:bold"
| colspan="4" |Source:
|
|}

2003

|-
! colspan=2 style="background-color:#E9E9E9;text-align:left;vertical-align:top;" |Candidate
! style="background-color:#E9E9E9;text-align:left;vertical-align:top;" |Party
! style="background-color:#E9E9E9;text-align:right;" |Votes
! style="background-color:#E9E9E9;text-align:right;" |%
|-
|style="background-color:"|
|align=left|Vasily Usoltsev
|align=left|United Russia
|
|44.95%
|-
|style="background-color:"|
|align=left|Vladimir Grishukov (incumbent)
|align=left|Communist Party
|
|21.45%
|-
|style="background-color:#00A1FF"|
|align=left|Sergey Plevako
|align=left|Party of Russia's Rebirth-Russian Party of Life
|
|7.94%
|-
|style="background-color:"|
|align=left|Sergey Gavrikov
|align=left|Liberal Democratic Party
|
|7.40%
|-
|style="background-color:#1042A5"|
|align=left|Tatyana Romanenko
|align=left|Union of Right Forces
|
|3.70%
|-
|style="background-color:#000000"|
|colspan=2 |against all
|
|12.84%
|-
| colspan="5" style="background-color:#E9E9E9;"|
|- style="font-weight:bold"
| colspan="3" style="text-align:left;" | Total
| 
| 100%
|-
| colspan="5" style="background-color:#E9E9E9;"|
|- style="font-weight:bold"
| colspan="4" |Source:
|
|}

2016

|-
! colspan=2 style="background-color:#E9E9E9;text-align:left;vertical-align:top;" |Candidate
! style="background-color:#E9E9E9;text-align:leftt;vertical-align:top;" |Party
! style="background-color:#E9E9E9;text-align:right;" |Votes
! style="background-color:#E9E9E9;text-align:right;" |%
|-
|style="background-color:"|
|align=left|Victoria Nikolaeva
|align=left|United Russia
|
|37.46%
|-
|style="background-color:"|
|align=left|Vladimir Grishukov
|align=left|Communist Party
|
|21.88%
|-
|style="background-color:"|
|align=left|Yevgeny Zotov
|align=left|Liberal Democratic Party
|
|16.20%
|-
|style="background:"| 
|align=left|Valery Mishkin
|align=left|A Just Russia
|
|7.28%
|-
|style="background-color: " |
|align=left|Dmitry Frolov
|align=left|Communists of Russia
|
|4.69%
|-
|style="background:"| 
|align=left|Pavel Sulyandziga
|align=left|Yabloko
|
|3.06%
|-
|style="background-color:"|
|align=left|Grigory Zhurlov
|align=left|Rodina
|
|2.66%
|-
| colspan="5" style="background-color:#E9E9E9;"|
|- style="font-weight:bold"
| colspan="3" style="text-align:left;" | Total
| 
| 100%
|-
| colspan="5" style="background-color:#E9E9E9;"|
|- style="font-weight:bold"
| colspan="4" |Source:
|
|}

2021

|-
! colspan=2 style="background-color:#E9E9E9;text-align:left;vertical-align:top;" |Candidate
! style="background-color:#E9E9E9;text-align:left;vertical-align:top;" |Party
! style="background-color:#E9E9E9;text-align:right;" |Votes
! style="background-color:#E9E9E9;text-align:right;" |%
|-
|style="background-color:"|
|align=left|Victoria Nikolaeva (incumbent)
|align=left|United Russia
|
|33.04%
|-
|style="background-color:"|
|align=left|Anatoly Yelishov
|align=left|Communist Party
|
|25.59%
|-
|style="background-color:"|
|align=left|Vasily Vasilyev
|align=left|Liberal Democratic Party
|
|7.04%
|-
|style="background-color: " |
|align=left|Yevgenia Zavarzina
|align=left|A Just Russia — For Truth
|
|6.70%
|-
|style="background-color:"|
|align=left|Anna Somova
|align=left|Party of Pensioners
|
|6.06%
|-
|style="background-color:"|
|align=left|Sergey Kushchakovsky
|align=left|New People
|
|4.50%
|-
|style="background-color:"|
|align=left|Lira Ivliyeva
|align=left|Russian Party of Freedom and Justice
|
|3.00%
|-
|style="background-color:"|
|align=left|Andrey Karpov
|align=left|The Greens
|
|2.66%
|-
|style="background-color:"|
|align=left|Marina Zheleznyakova
|align=left|Yabloko
|
|1.90%
|-
|style="background-color:"|
|align=left|Yevgeny Shkarupa
|align=left|Party of Growth
|
|1.83%
|-
|style="background-color:"|
|align=left|Sergey Milvit
|align=left|Rodina
|
|0.93%
|-
| colspan="5" style="background-color:#E9E9E9;"|
|- style="font-weight:bold"
| colspan="3" style="text-align:left;" | Total
| 
| 100%
|-
| colspan="5" style="background-color:#E9E9E9;"|
|- style="font-weight:bold"
| colspan="4" |Source:
|
|}

Notes

References

Russian legislative constituencies
Politics of Primorsky Krai